The Plastiki is a  catamaran made out of 12,500 reclaimed plastic bottles and other recycled PET plastic and waste products. Michael Pawlyn of Exploration Architecture worked on the concept design with David de Rothschild and helped to shape some of the key ideas. The craft was built using cradle to cradle design philosophies and features many renewable energy systems, including solar panels, wind and trailing propeller turbines, and bicycle generators. The frame was designed by Australian naval architect Andrew Dovell. The boat's name is a play on the 1947 Kon-Tiki raft used to sail across the Pacific by Norwegian explorer Thor Heyerdahl, and its voyage roughly followed the same route.

On March 20, 2010, the sailing vessel set off from San Francisco, California to cross the Pacific Ocean with a crew of six: British skipper Jo Royle, co-skipper David Thompson, expedition diver Olav Heyerdahl, filmmakers Max Jourdan and Vern Moen, and expedition leader David de Rothschild. The expedition projected landfall in Sydney, Australia and included plans to visit several sites en route of ecological importance or which were susceptible to environmental issues caused by global warming, for instance the current sea level rise, ocean acidification and marine pollution.

Plastiki arrived in Sydney Harbour on July 26, 2010, accompanied by a small flotilla of boats. Shortly afterwards, it was towed to the Australian National Maritime Museum in Darling Harbour, where it was on display until late August.

Documentary 

The documentary following the story of Plastiki and the state of the world's plastic use was titled Plastiki & the Material of the Future. Although never widely released, it screened at Mountain Film Festival in Telluride, Colorado. According to the production company's website the aspect of the film that had to do specifically with plastics has been re-edited and named simply The Material of the Future and premiered at the Friday Harbor Film Festival in Washington on November 7, 2014. There has been no official announcement as to why the film has been separated from the Plastiki.

See also
 Nice Collective
 Junk raft
 Project Kaisei
 Great Pacific Garbage Patch

References

External links

 
 CNN special coverage page
 "Adventurer's bottle boat to sail plastic sea". Times Online. Retrieved on 2009-01-18.
 Here On Earth: Radio Without Borders, April 20, 2009
 Sundance Channel: ECO TRIP - About David de Rothschild
 John Colapinto, “Message In a Bottle,” The New Yorker, April 6, 2009
 Plastic Boat: The Building of a High-Tech Eco-Stunt, Wired, Nov. 16, 2009
 "Boat made of plastic bottles sets sail across Pacific" BBC 21 March 2010
 National Geographic Adventure blog
 Plastiki Sails Into Sydney - slideshow by Life magazine
 L2 Industries - Materials, engineering, and production of the vessel
 Seretex - The material of The Plastiki

Individual catamarans
Pacific expeditions
Sailing expeditions
Individual sailing vessels